The Intervention of the Sabine Women is a 1799 painting by the French painter Jacques-Louis David, showing a legendary episode following the abduction of the Sabine women by the founding generation of Rome.

Work on the painting commenced in 1796, after his estranged wife visited him in jail. He conceived the idea of telling the story, to honour his wife, with the theme being love prevailing over conflict and the protection of children. The painting was also seen as a plea for the people to reunite after the bloodshed of the revolution. Its realization took him nearly four years.

Description 
The painting depicts Romulus's wife Hersilia – the daughter of Titus Tatius, leader of the Sabines – rushing between her husband and her father and placing her babies between them. A vigorous Romulus prepares to strike a half-retreating Tatius with his spear, but hesitates.

The rocky outcrop in the background is the Tarpeian Rock, a reference to civil conflict, since the Roman punishment for treason was to be thrown from the rock. According to legend, when Tatius attacked Rome, he almost succeeded in capturing the city because of the treason of the Vestal Virgin Tarpeia, daughter of Spurius Tarpeius, governor of the citadel on the Capitoline Hill. She opened the city gates for the Sabines in return for "what they bore on their arms". She believed that she would receive their golden bracelets. Instead, the Sabines crushed her to death and threw her from the rock, later named for her.

The towering walls in the background of the painting have been interpreted as an allusion to the Bastille, whose storming on 14 July 1789 marked the beginning of the French Revolution.

Production 
David began planning the work while he was imprisoned in the Luxembourg Palace from 29 May to 3 August 1795. France was at war with other European nations after a period of civil conflict culminating in the Reign of Terror and the Thermidorian Reaction, during which David had been imprisoned as a supporter of Robespierre. David hesitated between representing either this subject or that of Homer reciting his verses to his fellow Greeks. He finally chose to make a canvas representing the Sabine women interposing themselves to separate the Romans and Sabines, as a "sequel" to Poussin's The Rape of the Sabine Women. According to a popular account, he was inspired to paint it in honour of his estranged wife, Charlotte, after she visited him there. 

He began preparations shortly after his release, in the autumn of 1795, assisted in his research by his student Pierre-Maximilien Delafontaine. From February 1796, he worked in a temporary studio in the Louvre, and later moved to premises on the Champs-Élysées.

The female models for The Intervention of the Sabine Women were aristocratic women, whose appearances David blended with those of Classical sculptures. Numerous apocryphal anecdotes arose in Paris about the involvement of Adèle de Bellegarde and her sister Aurore, who modelled for the two central Sabine women. Aurore de Bellegarde became David's model for Hersilia, while Adèle modelled for the crouching figure seen to her right. Sources disagree as to how the arrangement began: in the version reported by Miette de Villars in 1850, the sisters and Thérésa Tallien, by then a leading figure in Parisian high society, heard that David had been struggling to find female models and visited his studio in the nude, offering to model for Hersilia. David is said to have exclaimed "" (", here I am like Paris in front of the three Graces!"). Certainly, both de Bellegarde sisters were well known among the Parisian art world, and for their acquaintance with artists of various genres.

In de Villars' version, David was most taken by Aurore, who sat for Hersitia, only asking Adèle and Tallien to pose "out of politeness". According to Delécluze, however, it was Adèle's long, dark hair that most interested him: at the time, he had already painted the crouching figure next to Hersitia (which had been completed by October 1796), and expressed regret that he had not had de Bellegarde's face as a model from which to do so. De Bellegarde accordingly allowed him to repaint the figure's face and hair after her own, while he used part of Aurore's leg in his figure of Hersitia. David's use of the de Bellegarde sisters as models has been interpreted as creating a link between the mythological Sabine Women and Parisian women of his own time, which has itself been interpreted as "affording a familial basis for the reconciliation of a divided and warring post-Revolutionary France".

According to Delécluze, the attention David paid to the painting of Adèle de Bellegarde's face led to rumours of an affair between her and the painter, which Delécluze considered baseless. Other rumours circulated as to whether she had posed fully nude.

The Intervention of the Sabine Women was first exhibited at the Louvre on December 21 1799, a few weeks after the Coup of 18 Brumaire, in what has been described as "the major artistic event of the late 1790s in Paris." The diaphanous gowns worn by its female characters were credited for starting a fashion for similar outfits, known as dresses  ("Ancient-style"), among Parisian high society.

Influence
The genesis of Les Sabines and the work itself represented a significant departure for the day. Historical depictions had been typically commissioned.  David however, conceived, produced and promoted his work for profit.  He produced marketing material to accompany the first exhibition.  Le Tableau des Sabines, Exposé Publiquement au Palais National des Sciences et des Arts ("the Tableau of the Sabines, Public Exhibition at the National Palace of Arts and Science") contained his own account of the historic episode and had an endnote explaining his rationale for using nudity in the painting. Its 1799 exhibition attracted a large number of paying visitors for several years. In 1819 David sold Les Sabines and his Léonidas at Thermopylae to the Royal Museums for 10,000 francs.

Starting in 1977, France issued a series of stamps featuring the head of Hersilia based on David's painting.

After the expulsion of artists including David from the Louvre, the painting was held in the ancient church of Cluny, which he used as a workshop. That building is now operated as the Musée de Cluny.

Footnotes

Explanatory notes

References

Bibliography

External links
 David – The Sabine Women A video discussion about the painting from Smarthistory, Khan Academy.
 https://collections.louvre.fr/en/ark:/53355/cl010065426

1799 paintings
Neoclassical paintings
Paintings in the Louvre by French artists
Mythological paintings by Jacques-Louis David
Paintings depicting Roman myths
Paintings of children
Horses in art
Paintings set in ancient Rome